Mimacraea fulvaria is a butterfly in the family Lycaenidae. It is found in the Republic of the Congo, the Democratic Republic of the Congo, Uganda and Tanzania. The habitat consists of dense forests.

Adults mimic Acraea aurivillii.

The larvae feed on algae growing on tree trunks.

Subspecies
 Mimacraea fulvaria fulvaria (Congo, Democratic Republic of the Congo: Ubangi, Shaba and Kinshasa)
 Mimacraea fulvaria eltringhami Druce, 1912 (Uganda, Democratic Republic of the Congo, Tanzania)

References

Butterflies described in 1895
Poritiinae
Butterflies of Africa